General Williams may refer to:

United Kingdom
Albert Henry Wilmot Williams (1832–1919), British Army major general
Aubrey Williams (British Army officer) (1888–1977), British Army major general
Edward Alexander Wilmot Williams (1910−1994), British Army general
Fenwick Williams (1800–1883), British Army lieutenant general in the Crimean War
Guy Williams (British Army officer) (1881–1959), British Army general
Harold Williams (British Army officer) (1897–1971), British Indian Army lieutenant general
Owen Williams (British Army officer) (1836–1904), British Army general
John William Collman Williams (1823–1911), Royal Marines general
Sydney Frederick Williams (1896–1942), British Army brigadier general

United States

U.S. Army
Alpheus S. Williams (1810–1878), Union Army brevet major general
Arthur E. Williams (born 1938), U.S. Army lieutenant general
Clarence C. Williams (1869–1958), U.S. Army major general
Claude A. Williams (fl. 1960s–2000s), U.S. Army major general
Darrell K. Williams (fl. 1980s–2000s), U.S. Army lieutenant general
Darryl A. Williams (born 1961), U.S. Army lieutenant general
Edward Thomas Williams (1901–1973), U.S. Army lieutenant general
Harvey D. Williams (1930–2020), U.S. Army major general
James A. Williams (1932–2017), U.S. Army lieutenant general
John F. Williams (1887–1953), U.S. Army National Guard major general
John R. Williams (1782–1854), U.S. Army brigadier general
Laurin Lyman Williams (1895–1975), U.S. Army lieutenant general
Nelson G. Williams (1823–1897), Union Army brigadier general
Paul S. Williams Jr. (1929–1995), U.S. Army lieutenant general
Robert Williams (adjutant general) (1829–1901), U.S. Army brigadier general
Robert B. Williams (general) (1901–1977), U.S. Army Air Forces major general in World War II
Samuel Tankersley Williams (1897–1984), U.S. Army lieutenant general
Seth Williams (1822–1866), Union Army brevet major general
Thomas Williams (Union general) (1815–1862), Union Army brigadier general
Timothy P. Williams (fl. 1980s–2010s), U.S. Army major general

U.S. Air Force
Adriel N. Williams (1916–2004), U.S. Air Force brigadier general
Gordon E. Williams (born 1935), U.S. Air Force major general
Paul L. Williams (general) (1894–1968), U.S. Army Air Forces and U.S. Air Force general
R. Scott Williams (fl. 1980s–2010s), U.S. Air Force lieutenant general
Stephen C. Williams (fl. 1980s–2020s), U.S. Air Force major general

U.S. Marine Corps
Dion Williams (1869–1952), U.S. Marine Corps brigadier general
Gregon A. Williams (1896–1968), U.S. Marine Corps major general
James L. Williams (fl. 1970s–2010s), U.S. Marine Corps major general
Michael J. Williams (born 1943), U.S. Marine Corps four-star general
Peter D. Williams (born 1939), U.S. Marine Corps major general
Robert H. Williams (soldier) (c. 1908–1983), U.S. Marine Corps brigadier general
Seth Williams (USMC) (1880–1963), U.S. Marine Corps major general
Willie Williams (general) (born 1951), U.S. Marine Corps lieutenant general

Others
John Williams (Salem, New York) (1752–1806), New York State Militia brigadier general
John Pugh Williams (c. 1750–1803), North Carolina Militia brigadier general pro tempore in the American Revolutionary War
John Stuart Williams (1818–1898), Confederate States Army brigadier general
Otho Holland Williams (1749–1794), Continental Army brigadier general
Robert Williams (Mississippi politician) (ca. 1770–1836), North Carolina Militia adjutant general

Others
Thomas Williams (Australian Army officer) (1884–1950), Australian Army master general in World War II
Victor Williams (general) (1867–1949), Canadian Army major general in World War I

See also
Attorney General Williams (disambiguation)